The 2015 EHF European Wheelchair Handball Nations’ Tournament was the first edition and was hosted for the first time in Austria from 12 to 13 December 2015.

Venues

Match officials

Preliminary round
''All times are local (UTC+1)

Knockout stage

Third place game

Final

Ranking and statistics

Final ranking

All-Star Team
Source:

Awards
Source:

Top goalscorers

References

External links
website
old website (archived)

2015
European Wheelchair Handball Nations’ Tournament
European Wheelchair Handball Nations’ Tournament
European Wheelchair Handball Nations’ Tournament
International handball competitions hosted by Austria
European Wheelchair Handball Nations’ Tournament